Foster Hall is a historic building on the campus of New Mexico State University in Las Cruces, New Mexico. It was built in 1930 to add more classrooms on campus, and it was named for a former professor, Luther Foster, who served as NMSU's president from 1901 to 1908. The building was designed by Braunton & McGhee in the Spanish Colonial Revival and Baroque Revival architectural styles. It has been listed on the National Register of Historic Places since May 16, 1989.

References

Buildings and structures on the National Register of Historic Places in New Mexico
National Register of Historic Places in Doña Ana County, New Mexico
New Mexico State University
School buildings completed in 1930
Spanish Colonial Revival architecture in the United States
Baroque Revival architecture in the United States
1930 establishments in New Mexico